Cornelyn is an area in the  community of Llangoed, Ynys Môn, Wales, which is 131.2 miles (211.2 km) from Cardiff and 207.4 miles (333.8 km) from London.

References

See also
List of localities in Wales by population

Villages in Anglesey